The 1977 BYU Cougars football team represented Brigham Young University (BYU) for the 1977 NCAA Division I football season. The Cougars were led by sixth-year head coach LaVell Edwards and played their home games at Cougar Stadium in Provo, Utah. The team competed as a member of the Western Athletic Conference, winning a share of the conference title for the second consecutive year, sharing the title with Arizona State with a conference record of 6–1.

The previous season, BYU was invited to the Tangerine Bowl, where they lost to Oklahoma State. Despite finishing the regular season with a record of 9–2 and ranked 17th in the AP Poll, the Cougars were not invited to a bowl game and dropped to twentieth in the final poll, and tied for sixteenth in the UPI Coaches Poll.

Schedule

Roster

Game summaries

Utah State
Senior quarterback Gifford Nielsen completed 30 of 40 passes for 321 yards and six touchdowns. Head coach LaVell Edwards pulled Nielsen with about three minutes left in the first half and again at 3:46 in the third quarter while three more potential touchdown passes were dropped otherwise Nielsen's stats would have been even greater. On the road in Logan, the BYU players were actually cheered by the Utah State fans as they left field.

Oregon State
Starting quarterback Nielsen injured his knee late in the loss at Corvallis on October 8, ending his collegiate career; he was replaced by sophomore Marc Wilson. The struggling Oregon State Beavers were seven-point underdogs, and went winless in the Pac-10 Conference.

Utah

BYU's Marc Wilson threw for 571 yards, breaking the single-game NCAA record set by Utah State's Tony Adams in 1972, also against Utah. Wilson was pulled with two minutes left, but returned a minute later and completed three passes, including a touchdown to John VanDerWouden, to set the record, which drew the ire of Utah head coach Wayne Howard.

Statistics

Passing

 Starting quarterback Nielsen was lost for the season late in the fourth game.

Awards
WAC Offensive Player of the Year: QB Marc Wilson
All-WAC: LB Mark Berntsen, RB Todd Christensen, WR Mike Chronister, OL Jason Coloma, DL Mekeli Ieremia, OL Lance Reynolds

NFL Draft

References

BYU
BYU Cougars football seasons
Western Athletic Conference football champion seasons
BYU Cougars football